Alan Robert Stockdale  (born 21 April 1945) is the former President of the Liberal Party of Australia and a former Victorian state Deputy Liberal leader. He was Treasurer of Victoria in the government of Jeff Kennett from 1992 to 1999.

Early life
Having attended Melbourne High School during his secondary years, Stockdale undertook his tertiary education at the University of Melbourne, obtaining his LL.B. in 1967 followed by his B.A. in 1970. Whilst at University, he was active within the Melbourne University Liberal Club, becoming president in 1965. He also chaired both the Melbourne University Debating Union and Melbourne University Debating Society, representing the University as an inter-varsity debating representative in 1966.

Stockdale has been married three times. After a brief marriage to Deirdre O'Shea, he married Doreen in the 1970s. They were together until the late 1990s, having three sons together. In 2003 Stockdale married Dominique Fisher.

Legal career
Upon completion of his tertiary education, Stockdale pursued a legal career as a self-employed barrister, specialising in industrial relations. In 1977, he was admitted to practice as a Barrister and Solicitor of the Supreme Court of Victoria, followed by the Supreme Court of New South Wales in 1982. Stockdale also signed the High Court Roll of Practitioners in 1977.

Political life
On 2 March 1985, Stockdale was elected to the Victorian Legislative Assembly as the Member for Brighton, a staunchly held safe seat for the Liberal Party. Stockdale then served on various Committees in opposition. In 1989 he contested to be leader of the State Liberal Party which saw him lose After Jeff Kennett resigned. However Brown was deposed when Jeff Kennett made his comeback in 1991. 

When the Liberal government of Jeff Kennett was elected in 1992, Stockdale became Treasurer. He is also credited with being the world's first Minister for Multimedia, to which portfolio was added the additional responsibility of Information Technology in 1998.

Post-political career
Upon retiring from state parliament in 1999, Stockdale proceeded to accept positions within the Macquarie Bank Ltd, as Executive Chairman, Asset & Infrastructure Group, as well as the Chairmanship of Axon Instruments Inc. He has also been appointed as Chairman, Symex Holdings Ltd; Executive Chairman, Infrastructure, Macquarie Bank Ltd; Director, Melbourne Football Club 1999-2001 and; Partner, Mills Oakley Lawyers 2005.

In 2013 when the oldest club in Australian Rules Football hit what can only be described as its lowest point in club history Stockdale has created and leads the "Melbourne Matters" campaign, it aims to run as Melbourne's board with Alan as the Club President.

Stockdale was Federal President of the Liberal Party from February 2008 until June 2014.

References

1945 births
Living people
Members of the Victorian Legislative Assembly
Liberal Party of Australia members of the Parliament of Victoria
Melbourne Law School alumni
People educated at Melbourne High School
Treasurers of Victoria
Officers of the Order of Australia
Politicians from Melbourne